The Temptations Christmas Card is a 1970 Christmas album by The Temptations for the Gordy (Motown) label. The album was released on October 30, 1970. It's also the group's first holiday release, it features each Temptation leading on various popular Christmas standards and original Christmas songs.

Track listing

Side One
"Rudolph the Red-Nosed Reindeer" (lead singers: Eddie Kendricks, Melvin Franklin; intro: Paul Williams, Dennis Edwards, Otis Williams, Melvin Franklin) 3:01
"My Christmas Tree" (lead singer: Eddie Kendricks) 3:21
"Santa Claus Is Coming to Town" (lead singer: Dennis Edwards) 3:26
"Silent Night" (lead singer: Eddie Kendricks) 2:26
"Someday at Christmas" (lead singer: Melvin Franklin) 3:27

Side Two
"White Christmas" (lead singers: Eddie Kendricks, Paul Williams, Dennis Edwards) 4:27
"Let It Snow! Let It Snow! Let It Snow!" (lead singer: Dennis Edwards) 3:37
"Silver Bells" (lead singers: Eddie Kendricks, Melvin Franklin) 2:13
"The Christmas Song" (lead singer: Otis Williams) 3:35
"Little Drummer Boy" (lead singers: The Temptations) 3:25

Personnel
Dennis Edwards - vocals
Eddie Kendricks - vocals
Paul Williams - vocals
Melvin Franklin - vocals
Otis Williams - vocals
The Funk Brothers - instrumentation

See also
Give Love at Christmas (1980)

References

The Temptations albums
1970 Christmas albums
Christmas albums by American artists
Gordy Records albums
Albums produced by Barrett Strong
Albums recorded at Hitsville U.S.A.
Rhythm and blues Christmas albums